Abrotanella purpurea is a member of the daisy family and is endemic species of southern Chile.

References

purpurea